Goldbricks in Bloom is a 2016 American comedy film written and directed by Danny Sangra and starring Waris Ahluwalia, Leo Fitzpatrick, Tavi Gevinson, Jake Hoffman, Adelind Horan, Evan Jonigkeit and Zosia Mamet. The film premiered on November 17, 2016, in Los Angeles and online through Vimeo.

Cast
Waris Ahluwalia as Christopher
Kat Clements as Julia
Margaret Clunie as Jess
Peter Davis as Scott
Leo Fitzpatrick as Otis
Tavi Gevinson as Calvin's Ex
Sam Hamill as Calvin
Jake Hoffman as Miles
Adelind Horan as Maripol
Evan Jonigkeit as Joe
Zosia Mamet as Cleo
Carson Meyer as Ella
Timothy Renouf as Charlie

References

External links
 

American comedy films
2016 comedy films
2010s English-language films
2010s American films